Loerie (Loerieheuwel is a township situated in Loerie) is a town in Sarah Baartman District Municipality in the Eastern Cape province of South Africa.

Settlement some 25 km north-east of Jeffreys Bay and 11 km north-north-west of the mouth of the Gamtoos River. Said to take its name from the loeries or louries, a turaco species (Tauraco corythaix) occurring here.

Loerie had a railway station on the Avontuur Railway which closed in 2011. 

In 1930, the Eastern Province Cement Company opened a limestone quarry and built a 14 km cableway to transport the stone to the Loerie railway station where it was transhipped to the Avontuur Railway to be processed in a cement factory near Port Elizabeth.

References

Loerie Quo Vadis, 'n Kultuur Historiese Oorsig, deur Theo Vosloo. p. 5

Populated places in the Kouga Local Municipality